Chunhua (disambiguation) may refer to:

Chunhua County (淳化县), Shaanxi
Dong Chunhua (1990–; 董春华), baseball catcher for the Shanghai Eagles
Hu Chunhua (1963–; 胡春华), Communist Party of China Secretary for Inner Mongolia
Jia Chunhua (1968–; 贾春华), a former football player for Shanghai East Asia FC
Zhang Chunhua (189–247 CE; 張春華), wife of the general Sima Yi
Chunhua, Changsha County (春华镇), town in Hunan